List of operators of the de Havilland Vampire:

Österreichische Luftstreitkräfte

Royal Australian Air Force
No. 21 Squadron RAAF
No. 22 Squadron RAAF
No. 23 Squadron RAAF
No. 25 Squadron RAAF
No. 75 Squadron RAAF
No. 76 Squadron RAAF
No. 1 Advanced Flying Training School RAAF
No. 2 Operational Conversion Unit RAAF
No. 5 Operational Training Unit RAAF
Central Flying School RAAF
Fleet Air Arm
723 Squadron RAN
724 Squadron RAN

Burmese Air Force 1954-1978, 8 x T.55s

Royal Canadian Air Force
No. 421 Squadron RCAF
No. 442 Squadron RCAF

Royal Ceylon Air Force 1954, 3 x T.55s delivered but not used and returned to de Havilland still crated, order for further T.55s and FB.52s cancelled.

Fuerza Aérea de Chile

Fuerza Aérea de Republica Dominicana operated 25 ex-Swedish F.1s and 17 ex-Swedish FB.50s.

Egyptian Air Force

Suomen Ilmavoimat

Armee de l'Air
Aeronavale

Indian Air Force
Indian Naval Air Arm

Tentara Nasional Indonesia - Angkatan Udara operated six T.11s.

Iraqi Air Force took delivery of 12 FB.52s fighters and 10 T.55 trainers between 1953 and 1955. These aircraft were affected to No. 5 Squadron. At least one T.55 was donated to Somalia in 1964.

Irish Air Corps operated six T.55 trainers between 1956 and 1976

Italian Air Force operated 268 Vampire from 1949 until 1960 

Japan Air Self-Defense Force received one Vampire T.55 trainer for evaluation in 1955.

Royal Jordanian Air Force

Katangese Air Force operated two ex-Portuguese T.11s.

Lebanese Air Force

Fuerza Aérea Mexicana retired their Vampires in 1967

Royal New Zealand Air Force
No. 14 Squadron RNZAF
No. 75 Squadron RNZAF

Royal Norwegian Air Force
No. 336 Squadron RNoAF
No. 337 Squadron RNoAF
No. 339 Squadron RNoAF
Jet Training Wing

Força Aérea Portuguesa Two T.55 trainers.

Rhodesian Air Force / Royal Rhodesian Air Force - No. 2 Squadron operated Vampire FB.9s and T.55s

Royal Saudi Air Force - 15 former Egyptian FB.52s delivered in 1957 and withdrawn in 1958.
No. 5 Squadron

Somali Air Force

South African Air Force

Flygvapnet operated 70 F.1 (designated J 28A); 310 FB.50 (J 28B) and 57 T.55 (J 28C) aircraft.

Schweizerische Flugwaffe Kommando der Flieger und Fliegerabwehrtruppen (Flugwaffe)

Syrian Air Force

Royal Air Force
No. 3 Squadron RAF F.1
No. 4 Squadron RAF FB.5, FB.9
No. 5 Squadron RAF F.3, FB.5
No. 6 Squadron RAF FB.5, FB.9
No. 8 Squadron RAF FB.9
No. 11 Squadron RAF FB.5
No. 14 Squadron RAF FB.5
No. 16 Squadron RAF FB.5
No. 20 Squadron RAF F.1, F.3, FB.5, FB.9
No. 23 Squadron RAF NF.10
No. 25 Squadron RAF NF.10
No. 26 Squadron RAF FB.5, FB.9
No. 28 Squadron RAF FB.5, FB.9
No. 32 Squadron RAF F.3, FB.5, FB.9
No. 45 Squadron RAF FB.9
No. 54 Squadron RAF F.1, F.3, FB.5
No. 60 Squadron RAF FB.5, FB.9
No. 67 Squadron RAF FB.5
No. 71 Squadron RAF FB.5
No. 72 Squadron RAF F.1, F.3, FB.5
No. 73 Squadron RAF F.3. FB.5, FB.9
No. 93 Squadron RAF FB.5
No. 94 Squadron RAF FB.5
No. 98 Squadron RAF FB.5
No. 112 Squadron RAF FB.5
No. 118 Squadron RAF FB.5
No. 130 Squadron RAF F.1
No. 145 Squadron RAF FB.5
No. 151 Squadron RAF NF.10
No. 185 Squadron RAF FB.5
No. 213 Squadron RAF FB.5, FB.9
No. 234 Squadron RAF FB.5, FB.9
No. 247 Squadron RAF F.1, F.3, FB.5
No. 249 Squadron RAF FB.5, FB.9
No. 266 Squadron RAF FB.5
No. 501 Squadron RAF F.1, FB.5, FB.9
No. 502 Squadron RAF F.3, FB.5, FB.9
No. 595 Squadron RAF F.1
No. 601 Squadron RAF F.3
No. 602 Squadron RAF FB.5
No. 603 Squadron RAF FB.5
No. 604 Squadron RAF F.3
No. 605 Squadron RAF F.1, F.3, FB.5
No. 607 Squadron RAF FB.5
No. 608 Squadron RAF F.1, F.3, FB.5, FB.9
No. 609 Squadron RAF FB.5
No. 612 Squadron RAF FB.5
No. 613 Squadron RAF F.1, FB.5, FB.9
No. 614 Squadron RAF F.3, FB.5, FB.9
No. 631 Squadron RAF F.1
No. 202 Advanced Flying School RAF
No. 203 Advanced Flying School RAF
No. 206 Advanced Flying School RAF
No. 208 Advanced Flying School RAF
No. 210 Advanced Flying School RAF
No. 226 Operational Conversion Unit RAF
No. 229 Operational Conversion Unit RAF
No. 233 Operational Conversion Unit RAF
No. 1 Flying Training School RAF
No. 3 Flying Training School RAF
No. 4 Flying Training School RAF
No. 5 Flying Training School RAF
No. 7 Flying Training School RAF
No. 8 Flying Training School RAF
No. 9 Flying Training School RAF
No. 10 Flying Training School RAF
No. 11 Flying Training School RAF
No. 102 Flying Refresher School RAF
No. 103 Flying Refresher School RAF
Central Flying School
Royal Air Force College
Central Air Traffic Control School
Central Navigation and Control School
Fleet Air Arm
700 Naval Air Squadron F.20, T.22
702 Naval Air Squadron F.20, T.22
703 Naval Air Squadron F.20, F.21
718 Naval Air Squadron T.22
724 Naval Air Squadron T.22
727 Naval Air Squadron T.22
728 Naval Air Squadron F.20
736 Naval Air Squadron T.22
750 Naval Air Squadron T.22
759 Naval Air Squadron F.20, T.22
764 Naval Air Squadron F.20, F.21, T.22
766 Naval Air Squadron T.22
771 Naval Air Squadron F.20, F.21
781 Naval Air Squadron T.22
787 Naval Air Squadron F.20
802 Naval Air Squadron T.22
806 Naval Air Squadron F.20, T.22
808 Naval Air Squadron T.22
809 Naval Air Squadron T.22
831 Naval Air Squadron T.22
890 Naval Air Squadron T.22
891 Naval Air Squadron T.22
892 Naval Air Squadron T.22
893 Naval Air Squadron T.22
1831 Naval Air Squadron T.22
1832 Naval Air Squadron T.22

Fuerza Aérea Venezolana

Zimbabwe Air Force - No. 2 Squadron operated Vampire FB.9s and T.55s. They were replaced by BAe Hawks in the 1980s.

References

Bibliography

 
 
 
 
 .
 

Vampire